Jean-Marc Piacentile (born 18 April 1963) is a French former professional tennis player.

Piacentile, a right-handed player, competed on the professional tour in the 1980s, reaching a best singles ranking of 195 in the world. His best performance on the Grand Prix circuit was a second round appearance at the 1982 Ancona Open.

As a doubles player he made three appearances in the main draw of the French Open and won a Challenger title in Salou in 1988.

Following his tennis career he worked as the leader of a player's union.

Challenger titles

Doubles: (1)

References

External links
 
 

1963 births
Living people
French male tennis players